Agnese Duranti (born 18 December 2000) is an Italian group rhythmic gymnast. She is a member of the national squad since 2015. She won a bronze medal, in Women's rhythmic group all-around, at the 2020 Summer Olympics.

She is the 2018 World Group All-around silver medalist and two-time European (2018) Group All-around silver medalist.

Career

Junior
She first appeared in Italian National team in 2015, when she was a member of a junior group which competed at the 2015 European Junior Championships and placed 6th in Group All-around and 5th in 5 Balls Final.

Detailed Olympic results

References

External links 
 

2000 births
Living people
Italian rhythmic gymnasts
European Games competitors for Italy
Gymnasts at the 2019 European Games
Medalists at the Rhythmic Gymnastics European Championships
Medalists at the Rhythmic Gymnastics World Championships
Gymnasts at the 2020 Summer Olympics
Olympic gymnasts of Italy
Medalists at the 2020 Summer Olympics
Olympic medalists in gymnastics
Olympic bronze medalists for Italy
21st-century Italian women